Connor Harris (born June 22, 1993) is an American football inside linebacker who is currently a free agent. He played college football at Lindenwood.

Early years
Harris was named the 2011 Missouri 6A Defensive Player of the Year and 2011 Kansas City Star Player of the Year in high school. He was also selected to the first-team all-state as a safety in 2011.

College career
Harris won the 2016 Cliff Harris Award and was named to the AFCA first-team All-American in his senior season (three time All-American throughout college career). Harris recorded an NCAA all-time record 633 tackles in 48 games at Lindenwood University.

Professional career

New York Jets
Harris signed with the New York Jets as an undrafted free agent on May 5, 2017. He was waived on September 2, 2017.

Arizona Cardinals
On October 3, 2017, Harris was signed to the Arizona Cardinals' practice squad. He was released on November 27, 2017.

Cincinnati Bengals
On December 20, 2017, Harris was signed to the Cincinnati Bengals' practice squad. He signed a reserve/future contract with the Bengals on January 1, 2018. He was waived by the Bengals on April 30, 2018.

References

External links
Lindenwood bio
New York Jets bio

1993 births
Living people
American football linebackers
People from Lee's Summit, Missouri
Players of American football from Missouri
Lindenwood Lions football players
New York Jets players
Arizona Cardinals players
Cincinnati Bengals players